Megacoelum is a genus of European, African, Asian and Australian capsid bugs in the tribe Mirini, erected by Franz Xaver Fieber in 1858.  The species Megacoelum infusum is recorded from northern Europe including the British Isles.

Species 
According to BioLib the following are included:
 Megacoelum andromakhe Linnavuori, 1974
 Megacoelum apicale Reuter, 1882
 Megacoelum biseratense (Distant, 1903)
 Megacoelum brevirostre Reuter, 1879
 Megacoelum brunnetii Distant, 1909
 Megacoelum esmedorae Ballard, 1927
 Megacoelum formosanum (Poppius, 1915)
 Megacoelum hormozganicum Linnavuori, 2004
 Megacoelum infusum (Herrich-Schäffer, 1837)
 Megacoelum macrophthalmum Reuter, 1907
 Megacoelum marginandum Distant, 1909
 Megacoelum minutum Poppius, 1915
 Megacoelum modestum Distant, 1904
 Megacoelum myrti Linnavuori, 1965
 Megacoelum nigroscutellatum Distant, 1920
 Megacoelum oculare Wagner, 1957
 Megacoelum patrum Distant, 1909
 Megacoelum pellucens Puton, 1881
 Megacoelum pistaceae V.G. Putshkov, 1976
 Megacoelum quadrituberculatum Poppius, 1912
 Megacoelum rubrolineatum Linnavuori, 1975
 Megacoelum salsolae Linnavuori, 1986
 Megacoelum schoutedeni Reuter, 1904
 Megacoelum sordidum Reuter, 1904
 Megacoelum suffusum Distant, 1904
 Megacoelum superbum Linnavuori, 1975
 Megacoelum tricolor Wagner, 1953
 Megacoelum zollikoferiae (Lindberg, 1953)

References

External links
 
 

Miridae genera
Hemiptera of Europe
Mirini